Vellaiya Thevan is a 1990 Indian Tamil-language film, directed by Manoj Kumar and produced by Eknaath. The film stars Ramki, Kanaka, Janagaraj and Chitra. It was released on 2 November 1990.

Plot

Cast 
Ramki
Kanaka
Janagaraj
Chitra
Anandaraj
Vijayakumar
Seema
Pasi Sathya
Singamuthu

Soundtrack 
The music was composed by Ilaiyaraaja.

Release and reception 
Vellaiya Thevan was released on 2 November 1990. The Indian Express praised the film for its stunt sequences and Ilaiyaraaja's score. C. R. K. of Kalki felt the makers messed up with the story but called Ramki's acting, Anandraj's villainy, melting music, thrilling scenes taken from American films, excellent making as positive points.

References

External links 
 

1990 films
1990s Tamil-language films
Films scored by Ilaiyaraaja